Dunce is a mild insult in English meaning "a person who is slow at learning or stupid". The etymology given by Richard Stanyhurst is that the word is derived from the name of the Scottish Scholastic theologian and philosopher John Duns Scotus.

Dunce cap

A dunce cap, also variously known as a dunce hat, dunce's cap or dunce's hat, is a pointed hat, formerly used as an article of discipline in schools in Europe and the United States—especially in the 19th and early 20th centuries—for children who were disruptive or were considered slow in learning. In the 19th century, it was seen by some as degrading: in 1831, children's book author Sidney Babcock wrote of the dunce cap as debasing and harsh, and in 1899, historian Alice Morse Earle compared it to other forms of school discipline she saw as degrading and outdated. It became unpopular in the early 20th century. Some American schools still permitted caps as late as the 1950s, however, and it was more recently banned in several areas in England and Wales in 2010. In modern pedagogy, punishments like dunce caps have fallen out of favor: by 1927 an editorial in the Educational Research Bulletin stated: "The rod and the cap were not eminently successful... we have our doubts about exclusion being the solution to the problem.... High scholarship is not produced by students who have their curiosity stifled by their teachers. Curiosity must be stimulated if scholarship is desired, and sympathy is essential to this stimulation."

The Oxford English Dictionary (3rd edition) cites mid-16th century examples of the term dunce used to describe a follower of Duns Scotus, a person engaged in ridiculous pedantry, or a person regarded as a "fool" or "dimwit". A visual depiction of the hat was first shown in the 1727 edition of The New England Primer, and the term dunce's cap is recorded as early as 1791. The first use of the term in literature was in 1840, in Charles Dickens' The Old Curiosity Shop.

The dunce cap has also been connected with donkeys to portray the student as asinine. An engraving featured in an early 1900s textbook depicts a child sitting on a wooden donkey in an "eighteenth-century" classroom, wearing a dunce cap with donkey ears.

A similar cap made of paper, and called a capirote was prescribed for sinners and penitents during the Spanish Inquisition.

See also

 Capirote
 Fool's Cap
 Sanbenito
 Tin foil hat

References

Further reading

External links

 Etymology of "dunce"

History of education
Slurs related to low intelligence
Pointed hats